Tirol KTM Cycling Team is an Austrian UCI Continental team founded in 2008.

Team roster

Major wins

2011
Gran Premio Palio del Recioto, Georg Preidler
2012
 National Time Trial Championships, Péter Palotai
Tour of Vojvodina II, Clemens Fankhauser
2014
Prologue Istrian Spring Trophy, Gregor Mühlberger
Trofeo Banca Popolare di Vicenza, Gregor Mühlberger
Overall Carpathian Couriers Race, Gregor Mühlberger
Stage 3 (ITT), Gregor Mühlberger
Overall An Post Rás, Clemens Fankhauser
Stage 3 Oberösterreich Rundfahrt, Gregor Mühlberger
 National Under-23 Road Race Championships, Gregor Mühlberger
Stage 5 Giro del Friuli-Venezia Giulia, Martin Weiss
Tour Bohemia, Lukas Pöstlberger
2015
Prologue Istrian Spring Trophy, Lukas Pöstlberger
Stage 1 Carpathian Couriers Race, Alexander Wachter
Overall An Post Rás, Lukas Pöstlberger
Stage 7 Tour of Austria, Lukas Pöstlberger
2016
Overall An Post Rás, Clemens Fankhauser
Stage 6 Tour de Serbie, Patrick Gamper
2017
GP Izola, Filippo Fortin
Stage 1 Szlakiem Grodów Piastowskich, Filippo Fortin
Tour de Berne, Filippo Fortin
Stage 1 Flèche du Sud, Filippo Fortin
Stage 5 Flèche du Sud, Matthias Krizek
Stage 2 Oberösterreich Rundfahrt, Filippo Fortin
Stage 7 Tour du Rwanda, Valens Ndayisenga
2018
Stage 2 Giro Ciclistico d'Italia, Markus Wildauer
Stage 3 Giro del Friuli-Venezia Giulia, Georg Zimmermann
2019
Trofeo Banca Popolare di Vicenza, Georg Zimmermann
Gran Premio Industrie del Marmo, Patrick Gamper
Coppa della Pace, Georg Zimmermann
Stage 2 Giro del Friuli-Venezia Giulia, Patrick Gamper
2022
Prologue Istrian Spring Trophy, Matevž Govekar

National Champions
2018
 Australia Track (Madison), Rohan Wight

References

External links

UCI Continental Teams (Europe)
Cycling teams based in Austria
Cycling teams established in 2008
2008 establishments in Austria